Satara lorquinii is a moth in the family Erebidae. It was described by Felder in 1874. It is known from eastern Sulawesi in Indonesia.

References

Moths described in 1874
Spilosomina